Pazo de Montecelo is a pazo (manor house) in Paderne, Province of A Coruña, Galicia, Spain. It contains French gardens.

References

Palaces in Galicia (Spain)
Buildings and structures in the Province of A Coruña
Manor houses in Spain
Houses in Spain